Ilgar Abdulov (born May 12, 1981 in Baku) is an amateur Azerbaijani Greco-Roman wrestler, who played for the men's super heavyweight category. He is a member of Neftçi Wrestling Club in Baku, and is coached and trained by Bakhram Milbatov.

Abdulov represented his nation Azerbaijan at the 2008 Summer Olympics in Beijing, where he competed for the men's 74 kg class. He first defeated Turkey's Şeref Tüfenk in the qualifying round, before losing out his next match to Russian wrestler and former Olympic champion Varteres Samurgashev, who pinned him in the first period.

References

External links
Profile – International Wrestling Database
NBC 2008 Olympics profile

Azerbaijani male sport wrestlers
1981 births
Living people
Olympic wrestlers of Azerbaijan
Wrestlers at the 2008 Summer Olympics
Sportspeople from Baku
21st-century Azerbaijani people